Morten Sørum is a Norwegian curler and World Champion. He was  a member of the winning team at the 1979 World Curling Championships, where the team was skipped by Kristian Sørum, and also included Eigil Ramsfjell and Gunnar Meland.

References

External links

Living people
Norwegian male curlers
World curling champions
Year of birth missing (living people)
20th-century Norwegian people